Douglas Earl Comer is a professor of computer science at Purdue University, where he teaches courses on operating systems and computer networks. He has written numerous research papers and textbooks, and currently heads several networking research projects. He has been involved in TCP/IP and internetworking since the late 1970s, and is an internationally recognized authority. He designed and implemented X25NET and Cypress networks, and the Xinu operating system. He is director of the Internetworking Research Group at Purdue, editor of Software - Practice and Experience, and a former member of the Internet Architecture Board. Comer completed the original version of Xinu (and wrote correspondent book The Xinu Approach) in 1979. Since then, Xinu has been expanded and ported to a wide variety of platforms, including: IBM PC, Macintosh, Digital Equipment Corporation VAX and DECstation 3100, Sun Microsystems Sun-2, Sun-3 and SPARCstations, and Intel Pentium. It has been used as the basis for many research projects. Furthermore, Xinu has been used as an embedded system in products by companies such as Motorola, Mitsubishi, Hewlett-Packard, and Lexmark.

Education and career 
Comer holds a BS in Mathematics and Physics from Houghton College earned in 1971 and a PhD in Computer Science from Pennsylvania State University earned in 1976.

He is a Distinguished Professor of Computer Science and professor of electrical and computer engineering at Purdue University in the US.

Beginning in the late 1970s he started his continuing research into TCP/IP, which has earned him international fame in the field of Computer Science and computer networking.

Achievements 
Douglas Comer headed a number of research projects associated with the creation of the Internet, and is the author of a number of books on Operating Systems, the Internet and TCP/IP networking, and computer architecture.

Comer is also the developer of the Xinu operating system.

Comer is well known for his series of ground breaking textbooks on computer networks, the Internet, computer operating systems, and computer architecture. His books have been translated into sixteen languages, and are widely used in both industry and academia. Comer's three-volume series Internetworking With TCP/IP is often cited as an authoritative reference for the Internet protocols.

For twenty years, Comer served as editor-in-chief of the research journal Software—Practice And Experience, published by John Wiley & Sons. Comer is a Fellow of the ACM and the recipient of numerous teaching awards.

Research Grants
Csnet Protocol Development – 1981
High-Level Network Protocols: Computer Research – 1983
Feasibility Studies of High-Performance Communication Over Public Packet-Switched Networks – 1984
Cypress: A Proposed Cost Effective Packet-Switched Interconnection Strategy – 1985
Shadow Editing – 1986
Computer Research Equipment – 1987
Extensible Terascale Facility (ETF): Indiana-Purdue Grid (IP-grid) – 2003
FIA: Collaborative Research: NEBULA: A Future Internet That Supports Trustworthy Cloud Computing – 2010

Publications
Comer has authored numerous research papers and seventeen popular textbooks that have been translated into sixteen languages.

Networks and Internets (including TCP/IP Protocols)

Internetworking With TCP/IP Volume III: Client-Server Programming and Applications, BSD Socket Version – 1996
Internetworking With TCP/IP Volume III: Client-Server Programming and Applications, AT&T TLI Version – 1996
Internetworking With TCP/IP Volume III: Client-Server Programming and Applications, Windows Sockets Version – 1997
Internetworking With TCP/IP Volume II: Design, Implementation, and Internals – 1999
Internetworking With TCP/IP Volume III: Client-Server Programming and Applications, Linux/POSIX Socket Version – 2000
Hands-on Networking with Internet Applications – 2004
Network Systems Design Using Network Processors – 2004
Network Systems Design Using Network Processors, Agere version – 2005
Automated Network Management Systems – 2006
Network Systems Design Using Network Processors, Intel 2xxx version – 2006
The Internet Book: Everything you need to know about computer networking and how the Internet works – 2007
Computer Networks And Internets Sixth Edition – 2014
Internetworking With TCP/IP Volume 1: Principles, Protocols, and Architecture, 6th edition – 2013

Computer Architecture And Operating Systems

Operating System Design Volume 2: Internetworking with XINU – 1987
Operating System Design Volume 1: The XINU Approach, PC version – 1988
Operating System Design Volume 1: The XINU Approach, Macintosh version – 1989
Internetworking With TCP/IP Volume II: Design, Implementation, and Internals – 1994
Essentials Of Computer Architecture – 2005
Operating System Design - The XINU Approach, Second edition – 2015

Awards
Usenix "The Flame" Lifetime Achievement Award (as part of the Software Tools Project) – 1996
Listed in Purdue University Book of Great Teachers – 1999
Fellow of the ACM – 2000
Fellow of the Purdue University Teaching Academy – 2003
School of Electrical and Computer Engineering, Courtesy Appointment – 2003
Purdue University Distinguished Professor – 2004
Joel and Ruth Spira Excellence in Teaching Award – 2012
Internet Hall of Fame - 2019

References 
 Comer's homepage at Purdue University
 Information about all of Comer's books
 List of Dougles Comer's books published by Prentice Hall
  Comer's description as listed by the Purdue Department of Computer Science

American computer scientists
Computer systems researchers
Computer science educators
American technology writers
Houghton University alumni
Internet pioneers
Penn State College of Engineering alumni
Purdue University faculty
Living people
Year of birth missing (living people)